Leonardus Johannes Petrus Maria (Léon) Frissen (Beek, 24 June 1950) was Queen's Commissioner or Queen's Governor of the province of Limburg, Netherlands.

In the Dutch province of Limburg, the Queen's Commissioner is usually called "Gouverneur" (governor), as in Belgium. Similarly, the "Provinciehuis" (Province Hall) at Maastricht is called "Gouvernement" (Governor's Residence). This local custom arose from the particular status of the current province in the nineteenth century.

Career 
 1971–1975 Council officer of the municipality Bingelrade (presently the municipality Onderbanken).
 1975–1979 Chief executive of the municipalities Bingelrade and Jabeek (presently the municipality Onderbanken).
 1979–1986 Director CDA-bureau Limburg in Sittard.
 1986–1994 Member of parliament (CDA).
 1994–2001 Mayor of the municipality Arcen en Velden.
 2001–2005 Mayor of the municipality Horst aan de Maas.
 2005-2011 Queen's Commissioner of the province of Limburg.
 2015–2018 Acting mayor of the municipality Schinnen, presently the municipality of Beekdaelen)

References 
  Parlement.com biography

External links 
 Read article: 'Léon Frissen, Governor of Limburg: “I am a European”', published by Rinnie Oey in Crossroads, 18 August 2006

1950 births
Living people
20th-century Dutch civil servants
20th-century Dutch politicians
21st-century Dutch politicians
Christian Democratic Appeal politicians
King's and Queen's Commissioners of Limburg
Mayors in Limburg (Netherlands)
Members of the House of Representatives (Netherlands)
People from Arcen en Velden
People from Beek